Castor most commonly refers to:
Castor (star), a star in the Gemini constellation
Castor, one of the Dioscuri/Gemini twins Castor and Pollux in Greco-Roman mythology

Castor or CASTOR may also refer to:

Science and technology
Castor (rocket stage), a family of solid-fuel rocket stages
Castor (software), data binding framework for Java
CASTOR (nuclear waste), cask for storage and transport of radioactive material
CASTOR experiment, "Centauro and Strange Object Research" at CERN
CASTOR (spacecraft), proposed space telescope
Castor sugar, fine sugar
Caster (or Castor), an undriven wheel
Caster (or Castor) angle, relevant to a steered wheel

Biology
Castor oil plant, plant from which castor bean grows
Castor oil, oil of the castor bean
Castor wax, produced from castor oil
Castor, a genus name of the beaver
Castoreum, natural scent derived from the beaver

People

Given name

Ancient
Castor of Rhodes, Greek grammarian and rhetorician
Drusus the Younger (13 BC – 23 CE), Roman consul, son of the Emperor Tiberius, nicknamed "Castor"
Antonius Castor, ancient botanist
Saint Castor, the name of several Christian saints
Castor of Apt (died c. 420), French bishop of Apt
Castor of Karden (died c. 400), German priest and hermit

Modern
Castor Cantero (1918–?), Paraguayan football player
Castor McCord (1907–1963), American jazz saxophonist
Castor (footballer) (born 1979), Edmilson Ferreira, Brazilian footballer

Surname
Betty Castor (born 1941), American educator and politician
Brian Castor (1889–1979), English cricketer
Bruce Castor (born 1961), American lawyer and politician
George A. Castor (1855–1906), American politician
Helen Castor (born 1968), English historian
Jean-Victor Castor (born 1962), French politician
Jimmy Castor (1940-2012), American musician
Kathy Castor (born 1966), American politician
Stacey Castor (1968-2016), American murderer
Steve Castor (born 1972/1973), American lawyer

Fiction
Castor Oyl, fictional character in the Popeye cartoons
Castor Troy, fictional character in the 1997 movie Face/Off, portrayed by Nicolas Cage and John Travolta
Castor, fictional character in the video game Spartan: Total Warrior
Lord Castor, fictional character in the 2007 movie The Harpy
Castor, fictional character in Tron: Legacy, portrayed by Michael Sheen
"Castor, Gobernador" fictional character in The Courts of the Morning by John Buchan
"Castor Wilds" fictional location in The Legend of Zelda: The Minish Cap by Nintendo
"Castor", fictional creature in the video game Persona 3

Places
Castor, Alberta, Canada
Queue de Castor River, Eeyou Istchee Baie-James, Jamésie, Nord-du-Québec, Canada
Rivière aux Castors Noirs, river in Quebec, Canada
Castor River (Ontario), Ontario, Canada
Castor, Louisiana, Louisiana, United States
Castor Creek, Louisiana, United States
Castor River (Missouri), United-States
Castor (mountain), in the Pennine Alps on the border between Switzerland and Italy
Castor Bay, Auckland, New Zealand
Castor, Cambridgeshire, England
Castor Temple, a summit in the Grand Canyon, United States
Castor, an old name for Caistor St. Edmund, Norfolk, England
Castor (crater) on Saturn's small moon Janus

Other uses
Castor (band), American rock band
Castor (cloth), a woollen fabric
Castor Cracking Group, Swedish music group
, the name of more than one ship of the British Royal Navy
Castor (1782 ship), a vessel launched in 1782 that made one voyage to Bengal for the British East India Company and that was last listed in 1808.
Castor gloves, gloves made from the skin of lambs or deer
 Castor hat
Project Castor, a set of male clones in the TV series Orphan Black
Castore (brand), British sportswear and athletic clothing company

See also
Caistor, a town and civil parish situated in the West Lindsey district of Lincolnshire, England
Caster (disambiguation)
Castro (disambiguation)
Gastor (disambiguation)
Kastor (disambiguation)